is a neighborhood located in Minami-ku in the city of Yokohama in Kanagawa Prefecture, Japan. In reference to the Keikyu Line, it is between Kami-Ōoka and Idogaya Stations.

Within Gumyōji is the temple, Gumyō-ji, from which it gets its name.  Also located within Gumyōji are the Ōoka Harappa park, Minami Library, Miurayu Onsen, the Kannon Dōri Shopping Street, Minami Police Station, the Open University of Japan, and the Uny store.

Gumyō-ji
The Gumyō-ji is the largest and oldest temple within Gumyōji.  It was built in 721 during the Tenpyō era by an Indian monk.  The temple has a statue that's registered as an important cultural asset.

Minami Police Station
The Minami Police Station was built in 1983.  The following table lists the number of crimes that occurred during 2006 and 2008 throughout Minami-ku.

In 2008 there were a recorded 766 traffic accidents in which 1 person died, 66 people were heavily injured, and 829 had minor injuries.

Minami Library
The Minami Library is two stories tall. The Minami Library sits directly behind Gumyōji Station.  The children's book section and front desk are on the first floor of the library.  On the second floor are the general books section, newspapers, magazines, and an area reserved for studying.  Three times a month, every second Saturday, third Tuesday, and fourth Wednesday there is a small event for children where they gather with the staff to learn, read books and play.

Minami Sports Center 
The Minami Sports Center is the main recreational center of Gumyōji.  Here people can partake in various sports, including badminton (8000 yen fee for 10 classes); table tennis (6000 yen fee for 10 classes); exercise for the elderly (2500 yen for 10 classes); dance (2500 yen for 10 classes); and t'ai chi (4000 yen for 10 classes).

Open University of Japan
In Gumyōji is one of the locations of the Open University of Japan.  5500 students attend this college, and about 90,000 students in total attend throughout all campuses.  The school offers life science, industrial society, humanities, and natural science.  There is also a tennis court located at the school for recreation.

Kannon Dōri Shopping Street
The Kannon Dōri Shopping Street is a path that runs between the Gumyōji Subway and the Gumyōji Keikyu Line.  This is also one of the most commonly taken paths in order to get to the Gumyōji Keikyu Line.  Kannon Dōri is lined with stores and street is covered in an arcade protecting pedestrians from rain.  These stores serve mainly neighborhood residents and include fruit and vegetable stores, shops selling Japanese tea, pharmacy, a takoyaki-okonomiyaki shop, etc. 

Uny, a chain of grocery stores located throughout Japan, also has a store is located near the Kannon Dōri Shopping Street.  Uny is a three-story building.  The first floor is a grocery store, while the second and third floors have household goods and a 100-yen shop.

The Kannon Bridge near the center of the Kannon Dōri Shopping Street is a popular meeting spot during the spring time because of the several cherry blossom trees lining the river which passes under the bridge.

Ōoka Harappa
Ōoka Harappa is one of the parks within Gumyōji near the Minami Sports Center.  Every year the people of Gumyōji celebrate various festivals and events here.  Some of those events include the Bon Festival and occasional flea markets.  The park is always open to the public; it is popular amongst young children as an after school activity.

References
1. Housou College (放送大学). Housou College home page. (2008).  Retrieved January 9, 2009 from: https://web.archive.org/web/20090210072413/http://campus.u-air.ac.jp/~kanagawa/index.htm

2. Tennen Onsen (天然温泉). Miurayu (みうら湯). (2008). Retrieved January 9, 2009 from: http://www.miurayu.com/

3. Minami Library (南図書館). Minami Library home page. (2008). Retrieved January 8, 2009 from: http://www.city.yokohama.jp/me/kyoiku/library/chiiki/minami/#riyou

4. Uny (ユニー). Uny home page. (2008). Retrieved January 8, 2009 from: http://www.uny.co.jp/store/uny-gumyoji/index.html

5. Minami Police Station (南警察署).  Minami Police Station home page. (2006). Retrieved January 8, 2009 from: http://www.police.pref.kanagawa.jp/ps/35ps/35_idx.htm

6. Minami Sports Center (南スポーツセンター). Minami Sports Center home page. (2005). Retrieved January 8, 2009 from: https://web.archive.org/web/20081225121041/http://www.yspc.or.jp/minami_sc/index.htm

Neighborhoods of Yokohama